Khorram Poshteh is a village in Basharyat-e Gharbi Rural District, Basharyat District, Abyek County, Qazvin Province, Iran. As of the 2006 census, its population was 1,094, in 272 families.

References 

Populated places in Abyek County